William Graham Sumner (October 30, 1840 – April 12, 1910) was an American clergyman, social scientist, and classical liberal. He taught social sciences at Yale University—where he held the nation's first professorship in sociology—and became one of the most influential teachers at any other major school.

Sumner wrote extensively on the social sciences, penning numerous books and essays on ethics, American history, economic history, political theory, sociology, and anthropology. He supported laissez-faire economics, free markets, and the gold standard, in addition to coining the term "ethnocentrism" to identify the roots of imperialism, which he strongly opposed.  As a spokesman against elitism, he was in favor of the "forgotten man" of the middle class—a term he coined. He had a prolonged influence on American conservatism.

Biography
Sumner wrote an autobiographical sketch for the fourth of the histories of the Class of 1863 Yale College. In 1925, the Rev. Harris E. Starr, class of 1910 Yale Department of Theology, published the first full-length biography of Sumner. A second full-length biography by Bruce Curtis was published in 1981.

Early life and education
Sumner was born in Paterson, New Jersey, on October 30, 1840. His father, Thomas Sumner, was born in England and immigrated to the United States in 1836. His mother, Sarah Graham, was also born in England. She was brought to the United States in 1825 by her parents. Sumner's mother died when he was eight.

In 1841, Sumner's father went prospecting as far west as Ohio, but came back east to New England and settled in Hartford, Connecticut, in about 1845. Sumner wrote about his high regard for his father: "His principles and habits of life were the best possible." Earlier in his life, Sumner said, that he accepted from others "views and opinions" different from his father's. However, "at the present time," Sumner wrote, "in regard to those matters, I hold with him and not with the others." Sumner did not name the "matters."

Sumner was educated in the Hartford public schools. After graduation, he worked for two years as a clerk in a store before going to Yale College, graduating in 1863. Sumner achieved an impressive record at Yale as a scholar and orator. He was elected to the Phi Beta Kappa Society in his junior year and in his senior year to the secretive Skull and Bones society.

Sumner avoided being drafted to fight in the American Civil War by paying a "substitute" $250, given to him by a friend, to enlist for three years. This and money given to him by his father and friends allowed Sumner to go to Europe for further studies. He spent his first year in the University of Geneva studying Latin and Hebrew and the following two years in the University of Göttingen studying ancient languages, history and Biblical science. All told, in his formal education, Sumner learned Hebrew, Greek, Latin, French, and German. In addition, after middle age he taught himself Dutch, Spanish, Portuguese, Italian, Russian, Polish, Danish, and Swedish.

In May 1866, he went to Oxford University to study theology. At Oxford, Henry Thomas Buckle planted the sociology seed in Sumner's mind. However, Herbert Spencer was to have the "dominating influence upon Sumner's thought."

Tutor, clergyman and professor
Except for a stint as a clergyman, Sumner's whole career was spent at Yale.

While at Oxford, Sumner was elected a tutor in mathematics. He was made a lecturer in Greek at Yale, beginning in September 1867.

On December 27, 1867, at Trinity Church, New Haven, Sumner was ordained Deacon in the Episcopal Church. In March 1869, Sumner resigned his Yale tutorship to become assistant to the Rector of Calvary Episcopal Church (Manhattan). In July 1869, Sumner was ordained Priest.

From September 1870 to September 1872, Sumner was Rector of the Church of the Redeemer in Morristown, N.J. On April 17, 1871, Sumner married Jeannie Whittemore Elliott, daughter of Henry H. Elliott of New York City. They had three boys: one died in infancy, Eliot (Yale 1896) became an officer of the Pennsylvania Railroad; Graham (Yale 1897) became a lawyer in New York City.

Robert Bierstedt writes that Sumner preached two sermons every Sunday at the Church of the Redeemer. They "stressed without surcease the Puritan virtues of hard work, self-reliance, self-denial, frugality, prudence, and perseverance." Furthermore, writes Bierstedt, "it may be said that Sumner spent his entire life as a preacher of sermons." However, Sumner "preferred the classroom to the pulpit," so he left the ministry and returned to Yale in 1872 as "professor of political and social science" until he retired in 1909. Sumner taught the first course in North America called "sociology."

Other than what he said in the ordination service, there is no information about what motivated Sumner to be ordained. At his ordination, Sumner said that he thought that he was "truly called" to the ministry.

Sumner did not make known, at least publicly, his reasons for leaving the ministry. However, he and historians suggest that it might have been a loss of belief and/or a dim view of the church and its clergy.

Clarence J. Karier says, "Sumner found that his deity vanished with the years." "I have never discarded beliefs deliberately," Sumner said later in life, but "I left them in a drawer and, after a while, when I opened it there was nothing there at all." Harris E. Starr found that Sumner "never attacked religion" or "assumed a controversial attitude toward it." At the same time, Starr found that during Sumner's time as a professor he stopped attending Trinity Church, New Haven, where he had been ordained Deacon. After that, Sumner attended church only occasionally. However, in the closing years of his life, he baptized a little grandson, and not long before his death he attended New Haven's St. John's Church to receive Holy Communion. Starr wrote that these two events "suggest that deep down in his nature a modicum of religion remained."

In his book What Social Classes Owe to Each Other (1883), Sumner argued that the "ecclesiastical prejudice in favor of the poor and against the rich" worked "to replunge Europe into barbarism." Furthermore, Sumner asserted, that this prejudice still lives, nourished by the clergy. "It is not uncommon," he said, "to hear a clergyman utter from the pulpit all the old prejudice in favor of the poor and against the rich, while asking the rich to do something for the poor; and the rich comply."

The Yale University Library's guide to Sumner's papers ranks him as "Yale's most dynamic teacher of the late nineteenth and early twentieth centuries. Students clamored to enroll in his classes." Sumner's "genuine love for aspiring students, commanding personality, wide learning, splendid dogmatism, and mastery of incisive English" makes it easy to understand his reputation.

Sumner himself described his life as a professor as "simple and monotonous." "No other life could have been so well suited to my taste as this," he wrote in his autobiographical sketch.

In spite of Sumner's description of his life as "simple and monotonous," he was "a champion of academic freedom and a leader in modernizing Yale's curriculum." This led Sumner into conflict with Yale's President, Noah Porter who, in 1879, asked Sumner not to use Herbert Spencer's Study of Sociology in his classes. "Sumner saw this as a threat to academic freedom and bluntly refused Porter's request. The faculty soon split into two factions one supporting and the other opposing Sumner's defiance." Sumner stood his ground and won out.

Until his 1890 illness, Sumner wrote and spoke constantly on the economic and political issues of the day. His "acidic style" outraged his opponents, but it pleased his supporters. The rest of Sumner's life at Yale was routine. In 1909, the year of his retirement, Yale awarded Sumner an honorary degree.

Although Sumner was a professor of political science, his actual involvement in politics was limited to two things he reported in his autobiographical sketch. In 1873–1876, he served as an alderman in New Haven. In 1876, researching the contested presidential election, he went with a group to Louisiana to find "what kind of a presidential election they had that year." Sumner said that was his "whole experience in politics." From this experience, he concluded, "I did not know the rules of the game and did not want to learn."

Retirement and death
Sumner's health deteriorated steadily beginning in 1890, and after 1909, the year of his retirement, it "declined precipitously." In December 1909, while in New York to deliver his presidential address to the American Sociological Society, Sumner suffered his third and fatal paralytic stroke. He died April 12, 1910, in Englewood Hospital in New Jersey.

Sumner spent much of his career as a muckraker, exposing what he saw as faults in society, and as a polemicist, writing, teaching, and speaking against these faults. In spite of his efforts, his career ended with pessimism about the future. Sumner said, "I have lived through the best period of this country's history. The next generations are going to see wars and social calamities."

Economics
Sumner was a staunch advocate of laissez-faire economics, as well as "a forthright proponent of free trade and the gold standard and a foe of socialism." Sumner was active in the intellectual promotion of free-trade classical liberalism. He heavily criticized state socialism/state communism. One adversary he mentioned by name was Edward Bellamy, whose national variant of socialism was set forth in Looking Backward, published in 1888, and the sequel Equality.

Anti-imperialism
Like many classical liberals at the time, including Edward Atkinson, Moorfield Storey, and Grover Cleveland, Sumner opposed the Spanish–American War and the subsequent U.S. effort to quell the insurgency in the Philippines. He was a vice president of the Anti-Imperialist League which had been formed after the war to oppose the annexation of territories. In 1899 he delivered a speech titled "The Conquest of the United States by Spain" before the Phi Beta Kappa Society of Yale University. In what is considered by some to be "his most enduring work," he lambasted imperialism as a betrayal of the best traditions, principles, and interests of the American people and contrary to America's own founding as a state of equals, where justice and law "were to reign in the midst of simplicity." In this ironically titled work, Sumner portrayed the takeover as "an American version of the imperialism and lust for colonies that had brought Spain the sorry state of his own time." According to Sumner, imperialism would enthrone a new group of "plutocrats," or businesspeople who depended on government subsidies and contracts.

Sociologist
As a sociologist, his major accomplishments were developing the concepts of diffusion, folkways, and ethnocentrism. Sumner's work with folkways led him to conclude that attempts at government-mandated reform were useless.

In 1876, Sumner became the first to teach a course titled "sociology" in the English-speaking world. The course focused on the thought of Auguste Comte and Herbert Spencer, precursors of the formal academic sociology that would be established 20 years later by Émile Durkheim, Max Weber, and others in Europe. He was the second president of American Sociological Association serving from 1908 to 1909, and succeeding his longtime ideological opponent Lester F. Ward.

In 1880, Sumner was involved in one of the first cases of academic freedom. Sumner and the Yale president at the time, Noah Porter, did not agree on the use of Herbert Spencer's "Study of Sociology" as part of the curriculum. Spencer's application of supposed "Darwinist" ideas to the realm of humans may have been slightly too controversial at this time of curriculum reform. On the other hand, even if Spencer's ideas were not generally accepted, it is clear that his social ideas influenced Sumner in his written works.

Sumner and Social Darwinism
William Graham Sumner was influenced by many people and ideas such as Herbert Spencer and this has led many to associate Sumner with social Darwinism.

In 1881, Sumner wrote an essay titled "Sociology." In the essay, Sumner focused on the connection between sociology and biology. He explained that there are two sides to the struggle for survival of a human. The first side is a "struggle for existence," which is a relationship between man and nature. The second side would be the "competition for life," which can be identified as a relationship between man and man. The first is a biological relationship with nature and the second is a social link, thus sociology. Man would struggle against nature to obtain essential needs such as food or water and in turn this would create the conflict between man and man in order to obtain needs from a limited supply. Sumner believed that man could not abolish the law of "survival of the fittest," and that humans could only interfere with it and in so doing, produce the "unfit."

According to Jeff Riggenbach, the identification of Sumner as a social Darwinist

Historian Mike Hawkins, however, argues that it is accurate to describe Sumner as a social Darwinist because Sumner draws directly upon evolutionary theory to explain society and dictate policy.

Sumner was a critic of natural rights, famously arguing

Warfare
Another example of social Darwinist influence in Sumner's work was his analysis of warfare in one of his essays in the 1880s. Contrary to some beliefs, Sumner did not believe that warfare was a result of primitive societies; he suggested that "real warfare" came from more developed societies. It was believed that primitive cultures would have war as a "struggle for existence," but Sumner believed that war in fact came from a "competition for life." Although war was sometimes man against nature, fighting another tribe for their resources, it was more often a conflict between man and man, for example, one man fighting against another man because of their different ideologies. Sumner explained that the competition for life was the reason for war and that is why war has always existed and always will.

"The Forgotten Man"
The theme of "the forgotten man" was developed by Sumner over a series of 11 essays published in 1883 in Harper's Weekly, and further developed in two speeches delivered that year. Sumner argued that, in his day, politics was being subverted by those proposing a "measure of relief for the evils which have caught public attention." He wrote:

Sumner's "forgotten man" and its relationship to Franklin Roosevelt's "forgotten man" is the subject of Amity Shlaes's The Forgotten Man.

Legacy
Sumner's popular essays gave him a wide audience for his laissez-faire advocacy of free markets, anti-imperialism, and the gold standard. Sumner had a long-term influence over modern American conservatism as a leading intellectual of the Gilded Age.

Thousands of Yale students took his courses, and many remarked on his influence. His essays were very widely read among intellectuals, and men of affairs. Among Sumner's students were the anthropologist Albert Galloway Keller, the economist Irving Fisher, and the champion of an anthropological approach to economics, Thorstein Bunde Veblen.

The World War II Liberty Ship  was named in his honor.

Yale University has maintained a professorship named in Sumner's honor. The following have been the William Graham Sumner Professor of Sociology at Yale University:
 1909–1942: Albert Galloway Keller (1874–1956)
 1942–1954: Maurice Rae Davie (1914–1975)
 1963–1970: August Hollingshead (1907–1980)
 1970–1993: Albert J. Reiss Jr. (1922–2006)
 1999–2009: Iván Szelényi
 2011–2015: Richard Breen

Works
Sumner's works number "around 300 items" including books and articles on "economics, political science and sociology."

Books and pamphlets
 The Books of the Kings (Scribner, Armstrong & Co, 1872) Sumner wrote section on 2 Kings.
 A History of American Currency: with chapters on the English bank restriction and Austrian paper money: to which is appended "The bullion report" (New York: H. Holt and Co., 1874)
 What Social Classes Owe to Each Other (New York: Harper and Bros., 1883)
 Protection and revenue in 1877: a lecture delivered before the "New York Free Trade Club," April 18, 1878 (New York: G. P. Putnam's Sons, 1878)
 Our Revenue System and the Civil Service: Shall They Be Reformed? (New York: G. P. Putnam's Sons, 1878)] contains preface by Sumner.
 Bimetalism: from the Princeton Review, 1879
 Andrew Jackson as a Public Man (Boston and New York: Houghton, Mifflin and Company, 1882)
 Lectures on the History of Protection in the United States: delivered before the International Free-Trade Alliance (New York: G. P. Putnam's Sons, 1883)
 Problems in Political Economy (New York: H. Holt and Company, 1883)
 Protectionism: the -ism Which Teaches that Waste Makes Wealth (New York: H. Holt and Company, 1885)
 Collected Essays in Political and Social Science (New York: Henry Holt and company, 1885)
 Alexander Hamilton (New York: Dodd, Mead and Co., 1890)
 The Financier & the Finances of the American Revolution, Vol 1 (New York: Dodd, Mead, and Co., 1891)
 The Financier & the Finances of the American Revolution, Vol 2 (New York: Dodd, Mead, and Co., 1891)
 Robert Morris (New York: Dodd, Mead, and Co., 1892). Morris' life adapted from The Financier & the Finances of the American Revolution
 A History of Banking in all the Leading Nations, Vol 1, edited by the editor of the Journal of Commerce and Commercial Bulletin (New York: The Journal of Commerce, 1896).
 The Conquest of the United States by Spain: a lecture before the Phi Beta Kappa Society of Yale University, January 16, 1899 (Boston: Dana Estes, 1899).
 The Predominant Issue: Reprinted from The International Monthly, November 1900 (Burlington, VT, The International Monthly, 1901)
 Folkways: a study of the sociological importance of usages, manners, customs, mores, and morals (Boston: Ginn and Co., 1906)
 Address of William Graham Sumner (New York: Reform Club Committee on Tariff Reform, June 2, 1906)
 The Science of Society, with Albert G. Keller, Vol. 1 (New Haven: Yale University Press, 1927; London: H. Milford, Oxford University Press, 1927)
 The Science of Society, with Albert G. Keller, Vol. 2 (New Haven: Yale University Press, 1927; London: H. Milford, Oxford University Press, 1927)
 The Science of Society, with Albert G. Keller, Vol. 3 (New Haven: Yale University Press, 1927; London: H. Milford, Oxford University Press, 1927)
 The Science of Society, with Albert G. Keller and Maurice Rea Davie, Vol .4 (New Haven: Yale University Press, 1927; London: H. Milford, Oxford University Press, 1927)

Collected Essays
 War, and other essays, ed. Albert Galloway Keller (New Haven: Yale University Press, 1911). Keller's "Introduction" contains a verbal portrait of Sumner.
 Earth Hunger and Other Essays, ed. Albert Galloway Keller (New Haven, Yale University, 1913)
 The Challenge of Facts: and Other Essays, ed. Albert Galloway Keller (New Haven: Yale University Press, 1914)
 The Forgotten Man, and Other Essays ed. Albert Galloway Keller (New Haven, Yale University Press, 1918)
 Selected Essays of William Graham Sumner, eds. Albert Galloway Keller and Maurice R. Davie (New Haven: Yale University Press, 1934)
 Sumner Today: Selected Essays of William Graham Sumner, with Comments by American leaders, ed. Maurice R. Davie (New Haven: Yale University Press, 1940)
 The Forgotten Man's Almanac Rations of Common Sense from William Graham Sumner , ed. A. G. Keller (New Haven: Yale University Press London, H. Milford, Oxford University Press,1943)
 Social Darwinism: Selected Essays of William Graham Sumner, ed. Stow Persons (Englewood Cliff, N.J.: Prentice-Hall, 1963).
 The Conquest of the United States by Spain, and Other essays  ed. Murray Polner (Chicago: Henry Regnery, 1965)
 On Liberty, Society, and Politics: The Essential Essays of William Graham Sumner, ed. Robert C. Bannister (Indianapolis: Liberty Fund, 1992)

Periodical Publications (not in collections)
 "The Crisis of the Protestant Episcopal Church", The Nation 13 (October 5, 1871): 22–23
 "The Causes of the Farmer's Discontent", The Nation 16 (June 5, 1873): 381–382
 "Monetary Development", 1875, Harper's 51:304.
 "Professor Walker on bi-Metallism", The Nation 26 (February 7, 1878): 94–96
 "Socialism", Scribner's Monthly 16:6 (1878): 887–893.
 "Protective Taxes and Wages", North American Review 136 (1883): 270–276
 "The Survival of the Fittest:" Index n.s. 4 (May 29, 1884): 567 (June 19, 1884), 603–604
 "Evils of the Tariff System", North American Review 139 (1884): 293–299
 "The Indians in 1887", Forum 3 (May 1887): 254–262
 "The Proposed Dual Organization of Mankind", Popular Science Monthly 49 (1896): 433–439
 "Suicidal Fanaticism in Russia", Popular Science Monthly 60 (1902): 442–447
 "The Bequests of the Nineteenth Century to the Twentieth", Yale Review 22 (1933 [ written 1901] ), 732–754
 "Modern Marriage", Yale Review 13 (1924): 249–275.

Notes

Further reading
 Bannister, Robert C., Jr. "William Graham Sumner's Social Darwinism: a Reconsideration". History of Political Economy 1973 5(1): 89–109.  Looks at Sumner's ideas, especially as revealed in Folkways (1906) and his other writings. Contrary to the position of the kind of social Darwinism sometimes attributed to him, he insisted equally on a distinction between the "struggle for existence" of man against nature and the "competition of life" among men in society. Sumner did not really equate might and right, and did not reduce everything finally to social power.
 
 Barnes, Harry Elmer, "Two Representative Contributions of Sociology to Political Theory: The Doctrines of William Graham Sumner and Lester Frank Ward", American Journal of Sociology, Vol. 25, No. 1 (Jul., 1919), pp. 1–23
 Beito, David T. and Beito, Linda Royster, "Gold Democrats and the Decline of Classical Liberalism, 1896–1900", Independent Review 4 (Spring 2000), 555–575.
 Bledstein, Burton J., "Noah Porter versus William Graham Sumner", Church History, Vol. 43, No. 3 (Sep., 1974), pp. 340–439.
 Carver, T. N, "William Graham Sumner (1840–1910)", Proceedings of the American Academy of Arts and Sciences, Vol. 53, No. 10 (Sep. 1918), pp. 865–867.
 Curtis, Bruce. William Graham Sumner. (Twayne's United States Authors Series, no. 391.) Twayne, 1981. 186 pp.
 Curtis, Bruce. "William Graham Sumner 'On the Concentration of Wealth'". Journal of American History 1969 55(4): 823–832.  Fulltext in Jstor. Sumner has usually been considered a dogmatic defender of laissez-faire and of conservative social Darwinism. But an examination of his unpublished essay of 1909, "On the Concentration of Wealth" (here published in full), reveals that his earlier views were subject to modification. In this 1909 essay he shows his concern for pervasive corporate monopoly as a threat to social equality and democratic government. His analysis was akin to that of a Wilsonian Progressive, although his remedies were vague and incomplete. This stand against plutocracy was consistent with his life and consisted of a long defense of a middle-class society against the pressures of greedy self-interest groups and demos, the mob. Earlier he was most concerned with threats from corrupt politicians. Later plutocracy threatened the middle classes through abuses which might have led to class warfare.
 Curtis, Bruce. "William Graham Sumner and the Problem of Progress". New England Quarterly 1978 51(3): 348–369.  Fulltext in Jstor. Sumner was one of the few late-19th-century Americans to reject a belief in inevitable human progress. Influenced by his understanding of Darwinism, Malthusian theory, and the Second Law of Thermodynamics, he came to believe the ancient doctrine of cycles in human affairs and in the universe. Based on Sumner's classroom notes and other writings.
 Curtis, Bruce. "Victorians Abed: William Graham Sumner on the Family, Women and Sex". American Studies 1977 18(1): 101–122. . Asks, did a Victorian consensus concerning sexuality exist? Sumner's life reveals many tensions and inconsistencies, although he generally supported the sexual status quo. His ideal of the middle-class family, nonetheless, led him to oppose the double sexual standard and to question the idea of a stable Victorian consensus on sexuality. He supported humane divorce policies and kinder treatment for prostitutes, and recognized women as sexual beings.
 Garson, Robert and Maidment, Richard. "Social Darwinism and the Liberal Tradition: the Case of William Graham Sumner". South Atlantic Quarterly 1981 80(1): 61–76. . Argues Sumner, drew upon themes and ideas that were firmly established in the political consciousness of Americans. The introduction of such devices as the struggle for survival and the competition of life served in fact to dramatize and highlight some of the central concerns of liberalism. When Sumner did repudiate certain fundamental premises of the liberal tradition, he did so on the grounds that the tradition was misconstrued and not because it was unsustainable. He did not discard liberal theory nor did he lose sight of its principal threads.
 Hartnett, Robert C., S. J. "An Appraisal of Sumner's Folkways", The American Catholic Sociological Review, Vol. 3, No. 4 (Dec., 1942), pp. 193–203.
 Hofstadter, Richard. "William Graham Sumner, Social Darwinist", The New England Quarterly, Vol. 14, No. 3 (Sep. 1941), pp. 457–477, reprinted in Hofstadter, Social Darwinism in American Thought, 1860–1915 (1944).
 Keller, A. G., "William Graham Sumner", American Journal of Sociology, Vol. 15, No. 6 (May, 1910), pp. 832–35. Eulogy written shortly after Sumner died.
 Lee, Alfred Mcclung. "The Forgotten Sumner". Journal of the History of Sociology 1980–1981 3(1): 87–106. . Sumner as sociologist.
 Marshall, Jonathan. "William Graham Sumner: Critic of Progressive Liberalism". Journal of Libertarian Studies 1979 3(3): 261–277. 
 McCloskey, Robert Green. "American conservatism in the age of enterprise, 1865–1910: A study of William Graham Sumner, Stephen J. Field, and Andrew Carnegie" (1964). It discusses Sumner's support for laissez-faire economics, free markets, anti-imperialism and the gold standard. It discusses Sumner's influence over modern conservatism as a leading intellectual of the Gilded Age.
 Pickens, Donald. "William Graham Sumner as a Critic of the Spanish American War". Continuity 1987 (11): 75–92. 
 Pickens, Donald K. "William Graham Sumner: Moralist as Social Scientist". Social Science 1968 43(4): 202–209. . Sumner shared many intellectual assumptions with 18th-century Scottish moral philosophers, such as Adam Smith, Thomas Reid, and Dugald Stewart. They were part of ethical naturalism. The major reason for this ideological kinship was the historical fact that Scottish moral philosophy was one of the major sources for modern social science. Sumner's Folkways [1907] illustrates the Scottish influence.
 Shone, Steve J. "Cultural Relativism and the Savage: the Alleged Inconsistency of William Graham Sumner". American Journal of Economics and Sociology 2004 63(3): 697–715.  Fulltext online in Swetswise, Ingenta, and Ebsco
 Sklansky, Jeff. "Pauperism and Poverty: Henry George, William Graham Sumner, and the Ideological Origins of Modern American Social Science". Journal of the History of the Behavioral Sciences 1999 35(2): 111–138.  Fulltext online at Swetswise and Ebsco
 Smith, Norman E. and Hinkle, Roscoe C. "Sumner Versus Keller and the Social Evolutionism of Early American Sociology". Sociological Inquiry 1979 49(1): 41–48.  Based on the contents of two recently discovered unpublished manuscripts of Sumner, concludes that he came to reject the basic premises of social evolutionism, 1900–10, and that his apparent support for the theory as stated in The Science of Society (1927, printed 17 years after Sumner's death) was actually the thought of Albert Galloway Keller, with whom he collaborated.
 Smith, Norman Erik. "William Graham Sumner as an Anti-social Darwinist". Pacific Sociological Review 1979 22(3): 332–347.  Sumner clearly rejected social Darwinism in the final decade of his career, 1900–10.

External links

 William Graham Sumner papers at Yale University Library
 Connecticut's Heritage Gateway
 Biography at ASA
 Works by William Graham Sumner
 Major Works of William Graham Sumner 
 Review materials for studying William Graham Sumner
 
 
 
 
 William Graham Sumner, Selected writings
 The Conquest of the United States by Spain Scalable text on white, grey or black backgrounds.

1840 births
1910 deaths
19th-century American essayists
19th-century American historians
19th-century American male writers
19th-century American non-fiction writers
20th-century American essayists
20th-century American historians
20th-century American male writers
American anthropologists
American historians
American libertarians
American male non-fiction writers
American political scientists
American political philosophers
American political writers
American sociologists
Libertarian theorists
Non-interventionism
Presidents of the American Sociological Association
Yale College alumni
Yale University faculty
Alumni of the University of Oxford
American expatriates in the United Kingdom
American anti-communists
Bourbon Democrats